Jay Ungar (born November 14, 1946) is an American folk musician and composer.

Life and career
Ungar was born in the Bronx, New York City.  He frequented Greenwich Village music venues during his formative period in the 1960s.  In the late 1960s, he became a member of Cat Mother and the All Night News Boys and later, the Putnam String County Band. Although he performs with David Bromberg, he is probably best known for "Ashokan Farewell" (1982), composed as a lament, and used as the theme tune to the Ken Burns documentary The Civil War (1990). Many of his other compositions are familiar as contradance tunes, notably "The Wizard's Walk."

In 1991, Ungar married fellow musician Molly Mason. They met during the 1970s. They continue to perform as a duo, with their band, Swingology, and as the Jay Ungar and Molly Mason Family Band with Jay's daughter Ruth Ungar (her mother is Lyn Hardy) and her husband Michael Merenda.

In 1992, Ungar and Mason provided the soundtrack to the acclaimed documentary film Brother's Keeper, released as a music CD entitled Waltzing with You (1998). In 2006, the duo headlined the Northwest Folklife Festival in Seattle.

References

External links
 Jay Ungar & Molly Mason
 Folk Alley Sessions:  Ashokan Farewell, Kent State University, Ohio, 2011.

American folk musicians
American fiddlers
American male composers
21st-century American composers
20th-century American Jews
Living people
1946 births
Angel Records artists
People from the Bronx
Musicians from New York City
21st-century American violinists
21st-century American male musicians
21st-century American Jews